The following lists events that happened during 2000 in Luxembourg.

Incumbents

Events

January
 1 January – The Grand Ducal Police is formed from a merger of the Gendarmerie
 1 January – Clearstream is established in Luxembourg City.

March
 March – The Parliament of France reports on money laundering in Europe, dedicated much of its space to Luxembourg and the Clearstream Affair.

May
 10 May – Jean-Claude Juncker delivers his sixth State of the Nation address.
 26 May – Jeunesse Esch win the Luxembourg Cup, beating FC Mondercange 4–1 in the final.
 31 May – A Tunisian gunman takes 49 children and five adults hostage at a nursery school in Wasserbillig.  The following day, the gunman is shot and critically wounded by police.  There are no other casualties.

June
 11 June – Alberto Elli wins the 2000 Tour de Luxembourg, with Team Telekom picking up the team title.

September
 12 September – Luxembourg signs an agreement with the European Space Agency allowing it to participate in the ARTES programme.
 14 September – SES launches its Astra 2B satellite.

October
 5 October – Luxembourg accedes to the UN Convention on the Law of the Sea.
 7 October – Grand Duke Jean's abdication is effected.  His eldest son, Hereditary Grand Duke Henri, succeeds him.

December
 19 December – SES launches its Astra 2D satellite.

Births

Deaths
 5 July – Joseph Wohlfart, politician

References

 
Years of the 20th century in Luxembourg
Luxembourg
2000s in Luxembourg
Luxembourg